Tamidou may refer to:

Tamidou, Zorgho, Burkina Faso
Tamidou, Zoungou, Burkina Faso